Dominic Martin Ball (born 2 August 1995) is an English professional footballer who plays for Ipswich Town. He plays primarily as a defensive midfielder but can also play as a centre-back or at full-back.

Club career

Tottenham and loan moves
A Tottenham Hotspur youth graduate, he joined the club's youth setup in 2011 from Watford and appeared in 17 matches during his first campaign, scoring one goal.

Ball appeared with the under-18s and with the under-21s in 2013–14, and was also named on the bench in a 2–2 UEFA Europa League away draw against Benfica on 20 March 2014. He was also an unused substitute in two further matches for Spurs in 2014–15, a 1–0 home win against Partizan and a 2–1 away win against Hull City.

On 22 January 2015, Ball was loaned to League Two side Cambridge United until the end of the season. He made his professional debut five days later, starting in a 1–1 home draw against Dagenham & Redbridge. He was used mainly as a right-back, making two assists in his time at the club.

On 14 August 2015, Ball signed a season-long loan deal with Scottish Championship club Rangers, reuniting with his Watford academy manager Mark Warburton. At Rangers, he helped them return to the Scottish Premiership as they won the Championship and also picked up honours when they won the Scottish Challenge Cup.

Rotherham United
On 12 August 2016, Ball signed for Championship side Rotherham United on a three-year deal. He was released from his contract at the end of the 2018–19 season, having spent all but five months of his three-year deal out on loan.

Peterborough United loan
On 3 January 2017, Ball joined Peterborough United on loan until the end of the season. He scored his first goal for Peterborough against Shrewsbury on the 14th of February. The loan ended early on 2 March 2017, after Ball had a disagreement with staff at Peterborough United.

Aberdeen loan
On 31 August 2017, Ball moved on loan to Aberdeen until the end of the season. He joined again for a second season-long loan spell on 18 July 2018.

Queens Park Rangers
Ball signed a two-year deal with Queens Park Rangers on 2 July 2019 upon expiry of his Rotherham United contract.

Ipswich Town
Ball joined Ipswich Town on 1 June 2022 on a two-year deal after the expiration of his contract with Queens Park Rangers. In November 2022, a ruptured meniscus ruled Ball out for the remainder of the 2022–23 season.

International career
After being capped by Northern Ireland in the under-15, under-16, under-17, under-19, and under-21 levels, Ball switched his allegiance to England in 2013. He has represented England up to U-20 level, making six appearances at that level.

Personal life
Ball was born in Welwyn Garden City, Hertfordshire. Ball has an older brother, Matt, who is also a footballer, while his father Tim was academy business manager at Watford. Ball graduated from the Open University in 2021 with a degree in business studies, having studied part-time for six years.

In April 2022, Ball released a book called From Winning Teams to Broken Dreams about the football academy system in England. All proceeds from the book go the charity Sarcoma UK.

Career statistics

Honours
Rangers
Scottish Championship: 2015–16
Scottish Challenge Cup: 2015–16
Scottish Cup runner-up: 2015–16

Aberdeen
Scottish League Cup runner-up: 2018–19

References

External links
Tottenham Hotspur official profile

1995 births
Living people
Sportspeople from Welwyn Garden City
English footballers
Association football defenders
Association football midfielders
Tottenham Hotspur F.C. players
Cambridge United F.C. players
Rangers F.C. players
Rotherham United F.C. players
Aberdeen F.C. players
Queens Park Rangers F.C. players
Ipswich Town F.C. players
English Football League players
Scottish Professional Football League players
Northern Ireland youth international footballers
Northern Ireland under-21 international footballers
England youth international footballers
English people of Northern Ireland descent